The 2019 IFMAR 1:10 Electric Off-Road World Championships was the eighteenth edition of the IFMAR 1:10 Electric Off-Road World Championship was held in Slovakia at the Hudy Arena which is effectively the test track for Xray. However the two wheel drive class was won by Spencer Rivkin racing an Team Associated RC10B6.1D bringing the manufacturers tally of IFMAR World Championships to thirty. In the 4WD class Bruno Coelho from Portugal took the victory with the XRAY.

Results
Note: A-mains only.

2WD Results

4WD Results

External links
 [E MyRCM : Online Events=48506 Official Results]
 Facebook Page
 Official Race Coverage Videos
 Short Highlight Videos

Reference

IFMAR 1:10 Electric Off-Road World Championship